Bistorta abukumensis is a species of flowering plant in the family Polygonaceae, native to Japan. It was first described in 1995.

References

abukumensis
Flora of Japan
Plants described in 1995